The Greece national beach soccer team represents Greece in international beach soccer competitions and is controlled by the HFF, the governing body for football in Greece.

Current squad
Correct as of August 2019

Coach: Gialesakis Nikolaos

External links 
beachsoccer.gr
  Team profile on Beach Soccer Russia
 Team profile at Beach Soccer Worldwide

European national beach soccer teams
Beach soccer in Greece
beach soccer